Masatoshi Kobayashi (8 October 1948 – 20 February 2003) was a Japanese luger. He competed in the men's singles and doubles events at the 1972 Winter Olympics.

References

1948 births
2003 deaths
Japanese male lugers
Olympic lugers of Japan
Lugers at the 1972 Winter Olympics
Sportspeople from Niigata Prefecture
20th-century Japanese people